Tony C. Stevens (born March 8, 1987) is an American football kicker for the Carolina Cobras of the National Arena League. He played college football at Hampden–Sydney College and attended Halifax County High School in South Boston, Virginia. He has also been a member of the Rio Grande Valley Dorados, Richmond Raiders, New Orleans VooDoo, Triangle Torch and Washington Valor.

Early life
Stevens attended Halifax County High School.

College career
Stevens played for the Hampden–Sydney Tigers from 2005 to 2009. He was the team's starter his final all four years at punter and his final two at kicker and helped the Tigers to 29 wins. Stevens was named Second Team All-Old Dominion Athletic Conference as a punter in 2006.

Statistics
Source:

Professional career

Rio Grande Valley Dorados
Stevens signed with the Rio Grande Valley Dorados for the 2009 season, where he would battle against Rubio Radamez for the teams kicking duties. Stevens beat out Radamez for the starting kicking duties, but was later replaced midseason by Radamez.

Richmond Raiders
Stevens signed with the Richmond Raiders of the Professional Indoor Football League. Stevens helped the Raiders clinch the top seed in the PIFL with a last second field goal to knock off the Albany Panthers on June 16, 2012. Following the 2012 season, Stevens was named the 2012 PIFL Special Teams Player of the Year. Stevens would go on to make First Team All-PIFL 3 times during his 4-year stint with the Raiders. Stevens added a second Special Teams Player of the Year award following the 2015 season.

New Orleans VooDoo
Stevens was assigned to the New Orleans VooDoo to replace an injured Brian Jackson. Stevens was 1 of 3 on field goal attempts and 15 of 18 on extra point attempts.

Triangle Torch
Stevens signed with the Triangle Torch in 2016.

Washington Valor
On April 5, 2017, Stevens was assigned to the Washington Valor. On May 31, 2017, Stevens was placed on reassignment. On June 21, 2017, Stevens was assigned to the Valor once again. On June 29, 2017, Stevens was placed on reassignment. On July 13, 2017, Stevens was assigned to the Valor once again.

Richmond Roughriders 
In 2018, Stevens returned to Richmond by signing with the Richmond Roughriders. Stevens started off the season by making four out of five extra point attempts versus the High County Grizzlies.

Baltimore Brigade
On May 16, 2019, Stevens was assigned to the Baltimore Brigade

References

External links

Living people
1987 births
Players of American football from Virginia
American football placekickers
Hampden–Sydney Tigers football players
Rio Grande Valley Dorados players
Richmond Raiders players
New Orleans VooDoo players
Triangle Torch players
Washington Valor players
American Arena League players
Baltimore Brigade players